Faqous Sporting Club (نادي فاقوس الرياضي) is an Egyptian association football club from the city of Faqous. They are playing in the Egyptian Second Division.

Colours
Faqous's colours are white and blue. Faqous's  home kit is a white shirt with  blue shorts. The team's away kit is a blue shirt with white shorts.

References

Football clubs in Egypt
Sports clubs in Egypt